Fehmi is a Turkish given name for males. It is Turkish spelling of the Arabic name and word Fahmi (Arabic: فهمي) which means "understanding, comprehension, knowing".

People named Fehmi include:

 Fehmî (1564–1596), Ottoman poet
 Fehmi Bülent Yıldırım (born 1966), Turkish Muslim activist
 Fehmi Koru, Turkish columnist and journalist
 Fehmi Mert Günok (born 1989), Turkish footballer
 Fehmi Naji (born 1928), Grand Mufti of Australia
 Hasan Fehmi Bey (1874-1909), Assassinated Turkish journalist
 Hasan Fehmi Güneş (1934–2021), Turkish politician
 Mustafa Fehmi Kubilay (1906-1930), Turkish national hero

See also
 Fahmi

Turkish masculine given names